Archedemus of Tarsus was a Stoic philosopher who flourished around 140 BC. Two of his works: On the Voice and On Elements, are mentioned by Diogenes Laërtius.

Archedemus is probably the same person as the Archedemus, whom Plutarch calls an Athenian, and who, he states, went into Parthia and founded a school of Stoic philosophers at Babylon.

Archedemus is also mentioned by Cicero, Seneca, Epictetus, and other ancient writers.

Notes

Hellenistic-era philosophers from Anatolia
Stoic philosophers
2nd-century BC Greek people
2nd-century BC philosophers
Year of birth unknown
Year of death unknown
People from Tarsus, Mersin